Guern is a commune in the Morbihan department of Brittany in north-western France. Inhabitants of Guern are called in French Guernates.

Population

Geography

The Sarre river flows through the village. The main settlements are the village centre, Quelven and Locmeltro. In the village of Quelven is the basilica Notre-Dame de Quelven.

Map

Gallery

See also
Communes of the Morbihan department

References

External links

Official site 

 Mayors of Morbihan Association 

Communes of Morbihan